Lykins is a surname. Notable people with the surname include:

Johnston Lykins (1800–1876), American politician
James Edward Lykins, American sculptor
Laura Lykins (born 1869/70), American lawyer